Study World College of Engineering (SWCE), in Coimbatore, Tamil Nadu, India is a private self-financing engineering institute. It is approved by AICTE and is affiliated to the Anna University Chennai. The college was established in 2009

Academics
SWCE offers five courses leading to degrees of Bachelor of Engineering (BE) of the Anna University Chennai.

BE
Mechanical Engineering (ME)
Computer Science and Engineering (CSE)
Electrical and Electronics Engineering (EEE)
Electronics and Communication Engineering (ECE)
Civil Engineering (CE)

ME
Computer Science & Engineering

Admission procedure
Admissions are as per the government of Tamil Nadu norms. Prospective students take the Tamil Nadu Engineering Admissions (TNEA) better known as Engineering Counselling done by the Anna University for Government Quota seats.

Facilities

The campus is 12 Mbit/s WIFI enabled. There are industry and institution linkage programmes.

Faculty
SWCE has 81 faculty in Science & Humanities and Engineering disciplines.

Computer Centre
The college has a Computer Centre for students with 150 computer terminals. The computers are installed with best software for Drafting, Applications and Programming. The college also offers secured Internet Infrastructure with internet use for students.

Central Library
SWCE has a library with more than 15000 books, 30 national and 10 international journals. The books are available for all disciplines of engineering, sciences, humanities and self-development. The library offers 350 educational CDs and a digital library with 10 computers that offers broadband internet connectivity.

Transport
The SWCE transport facility includes three vans starting from Gandhipuram, Aathupaalam, and Pollachi. The college is accessible by town buses — 50, 50C, 18, 66, 66A — which are available every 30 minutes from Gandhipuram Central Bus Stand.

Laboratories
 Physics Lab
 Chemistry Lab
 English Language Lab
 Engineering Practices Lab (Civil)
 Engineering Practices Lab (Mechanical)
 Engineering Practices Lab (Electrical)
 Engineering Practices Lab (Electronics)
 CAD Lab
 Computer Programming Lab

Sports
SWCE has multi-purpose grounds and gym. The following sports are available to the students:
Cricket
Hockey
Volleyball
Kabbadi
Kho Kho
Chess
Carrom

For sporting activities, the college is divided into four houses: 
Yellow Yeomans
Red Rockers
Blue Bullets
Green Glitters

Clubs
SWCE offers extracurricular activities through the following clubs and associations:
 KLIC Club - KVCT Learners and Innovators Club
 NSS Club - National Service Scheme Club
 CIVILWAY - Civil Engineering Association
 RENCE ELMUNDO - Computer Science and Engineering Association
 ELECTROVERTZ - Electronics and Communication Engineering Association
 LE MECHAZO - Mechanical Engineering Association
 NSS - National Service Scheme
 Youth Red Cross
 KVCT Quiz Club
 Nature Club
 Yoga Club
 Humour Club
 Music Club
 Tamil Mandram
 YRC - Youth Red Cross
 RRC - Red Ribbon Club
 Rotract Club
 WDC - Women Development Cell

Career planning
The college has a career planning module that encompasses career orientation, counselling, and guidance programmes to enrich the skills of the students and ease them into becoming an employer, employee, or a PG student.

References

External links
SWCE website
SWCE Official Facebook page
SWCE Twitter site

Engineering colleges in Coimbatore
All India Council for Technical Education